The Oldest Wooden School House is a wooden structure located at 14 St. George Street in St. Augustine, Florida near the city gate. It is touted as being the oldest wooden school building in the United States. The exact date of construction is unknown, but it first appears on tax records in 1716. There are no extant wooden buildings in St. Augustine built prior to 1702 when the British burned the city. The oldest schoolhouse still standing in the United States is the Voorlezer's House built prior to 1696 and located in Historic Richmondtown in Staten Island, New York.

The building is encircled by a large chain, placed there in 1937, to help anchor it to the ground in case of a hurricane. The walls are made of bald cypress and red cedar which are held together by wooden pins and iron spikes, however, recent maintenance has replaced the roofing, among other fixes. 

The schoolmaster and family lived on the second floor above the classroom and the kitchen was located in a separate building to reduce heat and threat of fire.  The building originally belonged to Juan Genoply. The classroom was one of the first in the US to be co-ed, educating both boys and girls since 1788.

Tours

The school is open to tourists every day except Christmas, with extended summer hours. The facility features a self-guided tour with an animatronic teacher and student (made by Sally Corp.) giving a brief history of the house. There are also numerous items and informational signs posted around the building. Gardens located behind the house feature exhibits on the kitchen, a rebuilt outhouse, an old well, and a sculpture garden displaying busts of famous educators.  The statuary was part of a project known as The Grove of Educators which sought to gather statues of educators from every country in the Americas, though only a few countries participated.

References and footnotes

References
Florida, DK Eyewitness Travel Guides, 2004, pg. 198

Footnotes

External links
 Oldest Wooden School House Website
 ThoughCo: Oldest Wooden School House
Educational institutions established in the 1700s
Defunct schools in Florida
Buildings and structures in St. Augustine, Florida
Schoolhouses in the United States
Museums in St. Augustine, Florida
History museums in Florida
Education museums in the United States
Oldest things
Wooden buildings and structures in the United States